The Lincoln Woodstock Cooperative School District is a comprehensive community public school district in Lincoln, New Hampshire, United States, that serves students from kindergarten through 12th grade.  

Lin-Wood Public School serves the communities of Lincoln and Woodstock, New Hampshire. The term Lin-Wood is a portmanteau of (Lin)coln and (Wood)stock, the two towns of the district.

Administration
Principal - Mark Pribbernow
Assistant Principal - Michael Weaver

Awards
The Middle School was named New Hampshire's Northwest Regional Middle School of Excellence by the New Hampshire Excellence in Education Awards Program in 1995, 1996 and 1997.

Academics
The May 2006 NHEIAP educational assessment report showed the school's high-school aged children performed above state averages in both math and reading.

Lin-wood has 96 students as of 2005 in grades 9–12.

    * White (95.4%)
    * Asian (3.7%)
    * African-American (0.9%)

References

External links

School districts in New Hampshire
Education in Grafton County, New Hampshire